Patrick Galbraith and David Macpherson were the defending champions, but Galbraith did not participate this year.  Macpherson partnered Steve DeVries, losing in the first round.

Ken Flach and Rick Leach won the title, defeating Stefan Kruger and Glenn Michibata 6–4, 6–1 in the final.

Seeds

Draw

Draw

References
 1993 Manchest Open Doubles draw

Doubles